Markus Palttala (born 16 August 1977 in Nakkila) is a Finnish racing driver. After racing in karts, Palttala began racing cars in the Finnish Touring Car Championship in 1998. He competed in the 2001 European Super Production Championship, driving a Honda Integra. Palttala's first run in Grand Touring cars came in 2000 in the single-make Porsche Carrera Cup Germany. He moved to the FIA GT Championship beginning in 2002, competing sporadically in 2006, 2008, and 2009, and also competed in its successor championships, the FIA GT1 World Championship and FIA GT3 European Championship through 2011. Palttala's best seasons came in 2011 and 2012 in the Blancpain Endurance Series, where he finished 2nd in the championship each year, driving for Marc VDS Racing Team.

Palttala drove in the Le Mans Endurance Series for various teams from 2005 until 2010. In the 2010 season, he won the GT1 class at the 1000 km of Spa and participated in the 24 Hours of Le Mans. He ran the FIA World Endurance Championship in 2012 (including another outing at Le Mans) and 2013. Palttala joined Turner Motorsport for the inaugural United SportsCar Championship season in 2014. He took his first GT-Daytona class win in the third race of the season at Mazda Raceway Laguna Seca, and followed it up with a dominating win at the Six Hours of Watkins Glen.

Complete motorsports results

24 Hours of Le Mans results

NASCAR
(key) (Bold – Pole position awarded by qualifying time. Italics – Pole position earned by points standings or practice time. * – Most laps led.)

Whelen Euro Series - Elite 1

Complete WeatherTech SportsCar Championship results
(key) (Races in bold indicate pole position; results in italics indicate fastest lap)

† Palttala did not complete sufficient laps in order to score full points.

References

External links
 
 
 

1977 births
Living people
People from Nakkila
Finnish racing drivers
FIA GT Championship drivers
European Le Mans Series drivers
FIA GT1 World Championship drivers
24 Hours of Le Mans drivers
Blancpain Endurance Series drivers
FIA World Endurance Championship drivers
WeatherTech SportsCar Championship drivers
24 Hours of Spa drivers
European Touring Car Championship drivers
24 Hours of Daytona drivers
Sportspeople from Satakunta
BMW M drivers
NASCAR drivers
Emil Frey Racing drivers
Rowe Racing drivers
Schnitzer Motorsport drivers
Nürburgring 24 Hours drivers
24H Series drivers
M-Sport drivers